Masaka is a city in the Buganda Region of Uganda, west of Lake Victoria. The city is the headquarters of Masaka District.

Location
The city is close to the Equator. The coordinates of Masaka are 0°20'28.0"S, 31°44'10.0"E (Latitude:-0.341111; Longitude:31.736111).

History 
Masaka was founded as a township in 1953. It became a town council in 1958 and a municipality in 1968.

Masaka was a strategically important location during the Uganda–Tanzania War (1978–79), and was accordingly garrisoned by Uganda Army troops. These soldiers terrorized the local civilians, and most fled the town. On 23–24 February 1979, the Tanzania People's Defence Force and allied Ugandan rebels attacked the settlement, resulting in the Battle of Masaka. The town was bombarded with artillery, and fell to the Tanzanian-led forces after light resistance. The Tanzanians subsequently levelled much of the town to take revenge for atrocities committed by the Uganda Army during its previous invasion of northwestern Tanzania.

In course of the Ugandan Bush War, Masaka again suffered from fighting. The town was garrisoned by the Uganda National Liberation Army which served as Uganda's national army at the time. In late 1985, National Resistance Army rebels laid siege to the town. After heavy combat, Masaka's garrison surrendered on 10 December 1985.

In 2019 the Cabinet of Uganda, resolved to award Masaka, city status effective July 2023. In November of the same year, Cabinet revised the date of city status to 1 July 2020.

Masaka City Council, with assistance from the Central Ugandan government and the World Bank is in the process of implementing major road and street improvements, as part of the Municipal Infrastructure Development (USMID) program. The city has a working budget of USh73 billion (approx. US$21 million), in the 2020/2021 financial year.

Population
According to the 2002 national census, the population of Masaka was about 67,800. In 2010, the Uganda Bureau of Statistics (UBOS) estimated the population at 73,300. In 2011, UBOS estimated the mid-year population at 74,100. In August 2014, the national population census put the population at 103,829.

In 2020, UBOS estimated the mid-year population of Masaka City at 116,600 people. The population agency calculated the population growth rate of the town to average 2.11 percent, between 2014 and 2020.

Overview

In 2016, before the metropolis attained city status, Masaka occupied .  It was divided into three administrative divisions, (a) Katwe-Butego (b) Kimaanya-Kyabakuza
and (c) Nyendo-Ssenyange. It is further subdivided into 54 zones.

The annual Uganda Marathon event takes place in June, the race route loops twice through the town and the funds generated support local employment and community development.

Points of interest
The following points of interest are located in Masaka or close to its borders: (a) the offices of Masaka City Council
(b) Masaka central market (c) the headquarters of the Mechanized Brigade of the Uganda People's Defense Force
(d) the main campus of Muteesa I Royal University (d) Western Campus of Kampala University (e) St. Henry's College Kitovu.

Other points of interest include (f) the headquarters of the Roman Catholic Diocese of Masaka (g) Lake Nabugabo,  to the east of downtown Masaka. (i) Masaka Regional Referral Hospital (j) Masaka Currency Center, a currency storage and processing facility owned and operated by the Bank of Uganda, Uganda's central bank. (k) A branch of the National Social Security Fund.

Notable people
Edward Ssekandi, Vice President of Uganda
Herman Basudde late performing artist
Charles Peter Mayiga katikkiro of Buganda 
Erias Lukwago Lord Mayor Kampala City
Mathias Mpuuga Leader of the Opposition in Parliament 
 (Edrisa Musuuza), Performing Artist
Wilson Bugembe musician 
Mukasa Mbidde politician and economist

See also
List of cities and towns in Uganda

Photos
The Uganda international marathon route loops Masaka Town, many photos of the town on their website

References

Works cited

External links

Masaka Town Expands To Get City Status
 Lake Nabugabo Homepage
Masaka District Internet Portal
River Of Life Church & Orphanage
Uganda International Marathon, Masaka

 
Populated places in Central Region, Uganda
Cities in the Great Rift Valley
Lake Victoria
Masaka District